Vendetta is the fourth album by Russian singer Zemfira (Russian: Земфира). The album sold around 500,000 copies in Russia and about 200,000 copies in other post-Soviet republics.

Track listing
"НебоМореОблака"               (SkySeaClouds)                          3:37
"Дыши"                         (Breathe)                               4:10
"Итоги"                        (Summary)                               3:17
"Так и оставим"                (Let's leave it as is)                  4:11
"Самолет"                      (Aeroplane)                             2:27
"Дай мне руку (я пожму ее)"    (Give me your hand (I will shake it))   3:32
"Блюз"                         (Blues)                                 3:28
"Прогулка"                     (Walk)                                  4:14
"Друг"                         (Friend)                                3:21
"Жужа"                         (Zhuzha)                                4:51
"Малыш"                        (Little one)                            2:50
"Повесица"                     (Hang myself)                           3:48
"Красота"                      (Beauty)                                3:11

bonus tracks:
"Разные (все такие)"           (Different (all of them))               2:56
"Jim Beam (Ufa '97)"                                                   2:25

2005 albums
Zemfira albums